Chile competed at the 2000 Summer Olympics in Sydney, Australia. 50 competitors, 43 men and 7 women, took part in 28 events in 14 sports.

Medalists

Archery

Chile has qualified one archer for the women's individual event.

Athletics

Chilean athletes have so far achieved qualifying standards in the following athletics events (up to a maximum of 3 athletes in each event at the 'A' Standard, and 1 at the 'B' Standard):

Men
Track & road events

Women
Track & road events

Cycling

Road

Equestrian

Chile has qualified 2 riders.

Jumping

Fencing

Chile has qualified 1 fencer.
Men

Football

Men's tournament

Roster

Group play

Quarterfinals

Semi-finals

Bronze medal match

Final rank

Judo

Rowing

Men

Women

Qualification Legend: FA=Final A (medal); FB=Final B (non-medal); FC=Final C (non-medal); FD=Final D (non-medal); FE=Final E (non-medal); FF=Final F (non-medal); SA/B=Semifinals A/B; SC/D=Semifinals C/D; SE/F=Semifinals E/F; QF=Quarterfinals; R=Repechage

Shooting

Men

Swimming

Men

Table tennis

Women

Men

Taekwondo

Tennis

Triathlon

See also
Chile at the 1999 Pan American Games

References

Nations at the 2000 Summer Olympics
2000 Summer Olympics
Summer Olympics